New York's 13th State Senate district is one of 63 districts in the New York State Senate. It has  been represented by Democrat Jessica Ramos since 2019. Ramos defeated  IDC-aligned incumbent José Peralta in the 2018 primary election; Peralta began his own Senate career by ousting corrupt Democratic incumbent Hiram Monserrate in a 2010 special election.

Geography
District 13 is centered around the Queens neighborhood of Jackson Heights, and includes Corona, Elmhurst, East Elmhurst, and parts of Astoria and Woodside. The district office is located in East Elmhurst on Junction Boulevard.

The district overlaps with New York's 6th and 14th congressional districts, and with the 27th, 30th, 34th, 35th, 36th, and 39th districts of the New York State Assembly.

Recent election results

2020

2018

2016

2014

2012

Federal results in District 13

References

13